The 2018–19 Sacramento Kings season was the 74th season of the franchise, its 70th season in the National Basketball Association (NBA), and its 34th in Sacramento. 

The Kings entered the season with the longest NBA postseason drought appearances at 12 seasons, last qualifying in 2006. On May 15, 2018, the Kings were given the 2018 NBA draft second pick via the lottery, their highest first round pick since the 1989 NBA draft, and selected Duke University's Marvin Bagley III. The Kings improved from the previous season and held a winning record through the All-Star break, reaching the 30 win mark at the break for the first time since 2005. Despite the improved record, they again missed the playoffs for a record 13th straight season on March 30th as they lost against the Houston Rockets. This was the most wins the Kings have had since the 2005–06 NBA season where the Kings had a 44–38 record as the 8th seed in the Western Conference and lost to the San Antonio Spurs in a six games series.

Draft picks

The Kings entered draft night with two selections, the first of which had them rise up from tying the Chicago Bulls with the sixth-worst record of the draft the previous season turned into having the #2 pick of the draft and the second pick resulting in them having the higher of second-round picks after losing the first-round tiebreaker to the Bulls.  With the second pick of the 2018 NBA Draft, Sacramento selected early freshman power forward Marvin Bagley III from Duke University. Marvin was one of the few top competitors entering the draft this year, and even though he was first projected to be a senior at Sierra Canyon High School earlier in the previous season, he jumped up into the collegiate rankings early to play a single season at Duke. In 33 games played for Duke (starting in all but one of those games), Bagley recorded spectacular averages of 21 points (at .614 overall percentage, including a .397 three-point percentage), 11.1 rebounds, 1.5 assists, .9 blocks, and .8 steals under 33.8 minutes per game. As a result, he was named a consensus All-American First Team member, the Pete Newell Big Man Award winner as the best low-post player that year, the ACC Rookie of The Year, the ACC Player of the Year, and a member of the All-ACC First Team. As for their second-round selection at #37 (which became Gary Trent Jr. from Duke University), it was traded to the Portland Trail Blazers for two future second round picks and cash considerations.

Roster

<noinclude>

Standings

Division

Conference

Game log

Preseason 

|- style="background:#bfb;"
| 1
| October 1
| @ Phoenix
| 
| Yogi Ferrell (26)
| Willie Cauley-Stein (12)
| De'Aaron Fox (5)
| Talking Stick Resort Arena8,184
| 1–0
|- style="background:#fcc;"
| 2
| October 4
| @ LA Lakers
| 
| Buddy Hield (18)
| Marvin Bagley III (10)
| Frank Mason III (5)
| Staples Center18,997
| 1–1
|- style="background:#fcc;"
| 3
| October 5
| @ Golden State
| 
| Harry Giles (17)
| Marvin Bagley III (9)
| Frank Mason III (7)
| Key Arena17,074
| 1–2
|- style="background:#bfb;"
| 4
| October 8
| Maccabi Haifa
| 
| Buddy Hield (22)
| Willie Cauley-Stein (8)
| Frank Mason III (8)
| Golden 1 Center17,500
| 2–2
|- style="background:#fcc;"
| 5
| October 11
| Utah
| 
| Marvin Bagley III (17)
| Marvin Bagley III (8)
| Buddy Hield (7)
| Golden 1 CenterN/A
| 2–3
|- style="background:#fcc;"
| 6
| October 12
| @ Portland
| 
| Ferrell, Hield (19)
| Nemanja Bjelica (9)
| Frank Mason III (8)
| Moda Center16,521
| 2–4

Regular season 

|- style="background:#fcc"
| 1
| October 17
| Utah
| 
| Willie Cauley-Stein (23)
| Nemanja Bjelica (8)
| De'Aaron Fox (8)
| Golden 1 Center17,583
| 0–1
|- style="background:#fcc;"
| 2
| October 19
| @ New Orleans
| 
| Willie Cauley-Stein (20)
| Marvin Bagley III (8)
| De'Aaron Fox (6)
| Smoothie King Center18,337
| 0–2
|- style="background:#cfc;"
| 3
| October 21
| @ Oklahoma City 
| 
| Iman Shumpert (26)
| Bagley III, Cauley-Stein (7)
| De'Aaron Fox (10)
| Chesapeake Energy Arena18,203
| 1–2
|- style="background:#fcc"
| 4
| October 23
| @ Denver
| 
| Marvin Bagley III (20)
| Marvin Bagley III (9)
| Frank Mason III (7)
| Pepsi Center13,214
| 1–3
|- style="background:#cfc;"
| 5
| October 24
| Memphis
| 
| Buddy Hield (23)
| Bjelica, Jackson (11)
| De'Aaron Fox (6)
| Golden 1 Center14,198
| 2–3
|- style="background:#cfc"
| 6
| October 26
| Washington
| 
| Nemanja Bjelica (26)
| Nemanja Bjelica (12)
| De'Aaron Fox (9)
| Golden 1 Center14,101
| 3–3
|- style="background:#cfc"
| 7
| October 29
| @ Miami
| 
| Willie Cauley-Stein (26)
| Willie Cauley-Stein (13)
| De'Aaron Fox (8)
| American Airlines Arena19,600
| 4–3
|- style="background:#cfc"
| 8
| October 30
| @ Orlando
| 
| Buddy Hield (25)
| Cauley-Stein & Hield (11)
| Fox & Mason III (5)
| Amway Center15,074
| 5–3

|- style="background:#cfc
| 9
| November 1
| @ Atlanta
| 
| De'Aaron Fox (31)
| De'Aaron Fox (10)
| De'Aaron Fox (15)
| State Farm Arena12,095
| 6–3
|- style="background:#fcc
| 10
| November 4
| @ Milwaukee
| 
| Justin Jackson (22)
| Iman Shumpert (6)
| De'Aaron Fox (6)
| Fiserv Forum17,341
| 6–4
|- style="background:#fcc
| 11
| November 7
| Toronto
| 
| Cauley-Stein & Hield (24)
| Willie Cauley-Stein (8)
| Iman Shumpert (6)
| Golden 1 Center17,583
| 6–5
|- style="background:#cfc
| 12
| November 9
| Minnesota
| 
| Willie Cauley-Stein (25)
| Buddy Hield (10)
| De'Aaron Fox (10)
| Golden 1 Center17,583
| 7–5
|- style="background:#fcc
| 13
| November 10
| L.A. Lakers
| 
| De'Aaron Fox (21)
| Willie Cauley-Stein (12)
| Fox, Bogdanović, Bjelica, Hield (2)
| Golden 1 Center17,583
| 7–6
|- style="background:#cfc
| 14
| November 12
| San Antonio
| 
| Bogdan Bogdanović (22)
| Willie Cauley-Stein (13)
| De'Aaron Fox (7)
| Golden 1 Center15,500
| 8–6
|- style="background:#fcc
| 15
| November 16
| @ Memphis
| 
| De'Aaron Fox (23)
| Cauley-Stein & Williams (8)
| De'Aaron Fox (10)
| FedExForum13,811
| 8–7
|- style="background:#fcc
| 16
| November 17
| @ Houston
| 
| Buddy Hield (23)
| Marvin Bagley III (8)
| Bogdan Bogdanović (5)
| Toyota Center18,055
| 8–8
|- style="background:#cfc
| 17
| November 19
| Oklahoma City
| 
| Buddy Hield (25)
| Willie Cauley-Stein (14)
| De'Aaron Fox (13)
| Golden 1 Center16,250
| 9–8
|- style="background:#cfc
| 18
| November 21
| @ Utah
| 
| Willie Cauley-Stein (23)
| Nemanja Bjelica (8)
| De'Aaron Fox (13)
| Vivint Smart Home Arena18,306
| 10–8
|- style="background:#fcc
| 19
| November 24
| @ Golden State
| 
| Buddy Hield (28)
| Marvin Bagley III (17)
| De'Aaron Fox (9)
| Oracle Arena19,596
| 10–9
|- style="background:#fcc
| 20
| November 25
| Utah
| 
| Bogdan Bogdanović (20)
| Harry Giles (8)
| Harry Giles (6)
| Golden 1 Center16,048
| 10–10
|- style="background:#fcc
| 21
| November 29
| L.A. Clippers
| 
| Bogdan Bogdanović (26)
| Willie Cauley-Stein (10)
| De'Aaron Fox (9)
| Golden 1 Center17,583
| 10–11

|- style="background:#cfc
| 22
| December 1
| Indiana
| 
| Bogdan Bogdanović (20)
| Willie Cauley-Stein (13)
| Fox, Bogdanović (6)
| Golden 1 Center17,583
| 11–11
|- style="background:#cfc
| 23
| December 4
| @ Phoenix
| 
| Buddy Hield (20)
| Nemanja Bjelica (7)
| De'Aaron Fox (7)
| Talking Stick Resort Arena12,977
| 12–11
|- style="background:#cfc
| 24
| December 7
| @ Cleveland
| 
| De'Aaron Fox (30)
| Kosta Koufos (8)
| De'Aaron Fox (12)
| Quicken Loans Arena19,432
| 13–11
|- style="background:#fcc
| 25
| December 8
| @ Indiana
| 
| Buddy Hield (20)
| Nemanja Bjelica (12)
| Fox, Bogdanović (6)
| Bankers Life Fieldhouse16,867
| 13–12
|- style="background:#cfc
| 26
| December 10
| @ Chicago
| 
| De'Aaron Fox (25)
| Willie Cauley-Stein (16)
| De'Aaron Fox (6)
| United Center18,164
| 14–12
|- style="background:#cfc
| 27
| December 12
| Minnesota
| 
| Nemanja Bjelica (25)
| Marvin Bagley III (10)
| De'Aaron Fox (8)
| Golden 1 Center15,770
| 15–12
|- style="background:#fcc
| 28
| December 14
| Golden State
| 
| Buddy Hield (27)
| Willie Cauley-Stein (11)
| De'Aaron Fox (9)
| Golden 1 Center17,583
| 15–13
|- style="background:#cfc
| 29
| December 16
| @ Dallas
| 
| Fox, Hield (28)
| Nemanja Bjelica (10)
| Fox, Bogdanović (5)
| American Airlines Center19,935
| 16–13
|- style="background:#fcc
| 30
| December 17
| @ Minnesota
| 
| Buddy Hield (21)
| Kosta Koufos (8)
| Frank Mason III (6)
| Target Center12,417
| 16–14
|- style="background:#fcc
| 31
| December 19
| Oklahoma City
| 
| Buddy Hield (37)
| Willie Cauley-Stein (7)
| De'Aaron Fox (12)
| Golden 1 Center17,583
| 16–15
|- style="background:#cfc
| 32
| December 21
| Memphis
| 
| Buddy Hield (28)
| Willie Cauley-Stein (13)
| De'Aaron Fox (8)
| Golden 1 Center16,369
| 17–15
|- style="background:#cfc
| 33
| December 23
| New Orleans
| 
| Buddy Hield (28)
| Willie Cauley-Stein (17)
| De'Aaron Fox (11)
| Golden 1 Center16,643
| 18–15
|- style="background:#fcc
| 34
| December 26
| @ L.A. Clippers
| 
| De'Aaron Fox (19)
| Hield, Fox (6)
| De'Aaron Fox (9)
| Staples Center19,068
| 18–16
|- style="background:#cfc
| 35
| December 27
| L.A. Lakers
| 
| Willie Cauley-Stein (19)
| De'Aaron Fox (9)
| De'Aaron Fox (12)
| Golden 1 Center18,375
| 19–16
|- style="background:#fcc
| 36
| December 30
| @ L.A. Lakers
| 
| De'Aaron Fox (26)
| Willie Cauley-Stein (12)
| De'Aaron Fox (7)
| Staples Center18,997
| 19–17

|- style="background:#fcc
| 37
| January 1
| Portland
| 
| Buddy Hield (27)
| Nemanja Bjelica (16)
| Bogdan Bogdanović (5)
| Golden 1 Center17,583
| 19–18
|- style="background:#fcc
| 38
| January 3
| Denver
| 
| Buddy Hield (29)
| Bjelica, Cauley-Stein (6)
| De'Aaron Fox (8)
| Golden 1 Center17,583
| 19–19
|- style="background:#fcc
| 39
| January 5
| Golden State
| 
| Buddy Hield (32)
| Willie Cauley-Stein (13)
| Bogdanovic, Fox (7)
| Golden 1 Center17,583
| 19–20
|- style="background:#cfc
| 40
| January 7
| Orlando
| 
| De'Aaron Fox (20)
| Willie Cauley-Stein (11)
| Bogdan Bogdanović (7)
| Golden 1 Center15,724
| 20–20
|- style="background:#fcc
| 41
| January 8
| @ Phoenix
| 
| De'Aaron Fox (24)
| Willie Cauley-Stein (7)
| Fox, Bogdanović (5)
| Talking Stick Resort Arena13,977
| 20–21
|- style="background:#cfc
| 42
| January 10
| Detroit
| 
| Buddy Hield (18)
| Willie Cauley-Stein (14)
| De'Aaron Fox (6)
| Golden 1 Center16,916
| 21–21
|- style="background:#cfc
| 43
| January 12
| Charlotte
| 
| Bogdan Bogdanović (22)
| Willie Cauley-Stein (12)
| Bjelica, Cauley-Stein, Fox (4)
| Golden 1 Center17,853
| 22–21
|- style="background:#cfc
| 44
| January 14
| Portland
| 
| Buddy Hield (19)
| Marvin Bagley III (11)
| De'Aaron Fox (9)
| Golden 1 Center17,583
| 23–21
|- style="background:#fcc
| 45
| January 17
| @ Charlotte
| 
| Buddy Hield (24)
| Willie Cauley-Stein (11)
| De'Aaron Fox (8)
| Spectrum Center15,431
| 23–22
|- style="background:#cfc
| 46
| January 19
| @ Detroit
| 
| Buddy Hield (35)
| Buddy Hield (9)
| De'Aaron Fox (10)
| Little Caesars Arena15,377
| 24–22
|- style="background:#fcc
| 47
| January 21
| @ Brooklyn
| 
| Bogdan Bogdanović (22)
| Buddy Hield (7)
| Bogdan Bogdanović (11)
| Barclays Center14,233
| 24–23
|- style="background:#fcc
| 48
| January 22
| @ Toronto
| 
| Marvin Bagley III (22)
| Marvin Bagley III (11)
| Bogdan Bogdanović (6)
| Scotiabank Arena19,800
| 24–24
|- style="background:#cfc
| 49
| January 25
| @ Memphis
| 
| Buddy Hield (26)
| Nemanja Bjelica (11)
| Shumpert, Fox (5)
| FedExForum14,486
| 25–24
|- style="background:#fcc
| 50
| January 27
| @ L.A. Clippers
| 
| De'Aaron Fox (20)
| Willie Cauley-Stein (12)
| Buddy Hield (5)
| Staples Center19,068
| 25–25
|- style="background:#cfc
| 51
| January 30
| Atlanta
| 
| Harry Giles (20)
| Marvin Bagley III (12)
| Bogdanović, Fox (7)
| Golden 1 Center17,583
| 26–25

|- style="background:#cfc
| 52
| February 2
| Philadelphia
| 
| Buddy Hield (34) 
| Marvin Bagley (13)
| De'Aaron Fox (8)
| Golden 1 Center17,583
| 27–25
|- style="background:#cfc
| 53
| February 4
| San Antonio
| 
| De'Aaron Fox (20)
| Marvin Bagley (12)
| Shumpert, Fox (6)
| Golden 1 Center16,245
| 28–25
|- style="background:#fcc
| 54
| February 6
| Houston
| 
| Buddy Hield (20) 
| Hield, Bagley (10)
| De'Aaron Fox (6)
| Golden 1 Center17,583
| 28–26
|- style="background:#cfc
| 55
| February 8
| Miami
| 
| Buddy Hield (23) 
| Barnes, Hield, Cauley-Stein, Bagley (7)
| Yogi Ferrell (5)
| Golden 1 Center17,583
| 29–26
|- style="background:#cfc
| 56
| February 10
| Phoenix
| 
| Marvin Bagley (32)
| Bjelica, Cauley-Stein (8)
| De'Aaron Fox (9)
| Golden 1 Center17,583
| 30–26
|- style="background:#fcc
| 57
| February 13
| @ Denver
| 
| Buddy Hield (25)
| Harrison Barnes (11)
| De'Aaron Fox (10)
| Pepsi Center17,938
| 30–27
|- style="background:#fcc
| 58
| February 21
| @ Golden State
| 
| Marvin Bagley (28)
| Marvin Bagley (14)
| De'Aaron Fox (8)
| Oracle Arena19,596
| 30–28
|- style="background:#cfc
| 59
| February 23
| @ Oklahoma City 
| 
| Buddy Hield (34)
| Willie Cauley-Stein (11)
| De'Aaron Fox (9)
| Chesapeake Energy Arena18,203
| 31–28
|- style="background:#fcc
| 60
| February 25
| @ Minnesota
| 
| Marvin Bagley (25)
| Marvin Bagley (11)
| Bogdan Bogdanović (6)
| Target Center13,691
| 31–29
|- style="background:#fcc
| 61
| February 27
| Milwaukee
| 
| Buddy Hield (32)
| Harrison Barnes (14)
| De'Aaron Fox (9)
| Golden 1 Center17,583
| 31–30

|- style="background:#fcc
| 62 
| March 1
| L.A. Clippers
| 
| Buddy Hield (23)
| Willie Cauley-Stein (12)
| De'Aaron Fox (12)
| Golden 1 Center17,583
| 31–31
|- style="background:#cfc
| 63
| March 4
| N.Y. Knicks
| 
| Buddy Hield (28)
| Harrison Barnes (10)
| Buddy Hield (7)
| Golden 1 Center17,034
| 32–31
|- style="background:#fcc
| 64
| March 6
| Boston
| 
| Harrison Barnes (24)
| Barnes, Hield (8)
| De'Aaron Fox (7)
| Golden 1 Center17,583
| 32–32
|- style="background:#cfc
| 65
| March 9
| @ N.Y. Knicks
| 
| De'Aaron Fox (30)
| Willie Cauley-Stein (12)
| De'Aaron Fox (8)
| Madison Square Garden19,812
| 33–32
|- style="background:#fcc
| 66
| March 11
| @ Washington
| 
| De'Aaron Fox (20)
| Nemanja Bjelica (12)
| De'Aaron Fox (8)
| Capital One Arena15,012
| 33–33
|- style="background:#fcc
| 67
| March 14
| @ Boston
| 
| Buddy Hield (34)
| Willie Cauley-Stein (13)
| De'Aaron Fox (9)
| TD Garden18,624
| 33–34
|- style="background:#fcc
| 68
| March 15
| @ Philadelphia
| 
| Harrison Barnes (16)
| Willie Cauley-Stein (7)
| De'Aaron Fox (6)
| Wells Fargo Center20,724
| 33–35
|- style="background:#cfc
| 69
| March 17
| Chicago
| 
| Marvin Bagley (21)
| Marvin Bagley (9)
| Willie Cauley-Stein (5)
| Golden 1 Center17,583
| 34–35
|- style="background:#fcc
| 70
| March 19
| Brooklyn
| 
| De'Aaron Fox (27)
| Nemanja Bjelica (10)
| De'Aaron Fox (9)
| Golden 1 Center17,583
| 34–36
|- style="background:#cfc
| 71
| March 21
| Dallas
| 
| Buddy Hield (29)
| Willie Cauley-Stein (18)
| De'Aaron Fox (9)
| Golden 1 Center17,583
| 35–36
|- style="background:#cfc
| 72
| March 23
| Phoenix
| 
| Barnes, Hield (25)
| Nemanja Bjelica (17)
| De'Aaron Fox (9)
| Golden 1 Center17,583
| 36–36
|- style="background:#fcc
| 73
| March 24
| @ L. A. Lakers
| 
| Marvin Bagley (25)
| Marvin Bagley (11)
| Barnes, Fox, Bogdanović (5)
| Staples Center18,997
| 36–37
|- style="background:#cfc
| 74
| March 26
| @ Dallas
| 
| De'Aaron Fox (23)
| Willie Cauley-Stein (7)
| De'Aaron Fox (8)
| American Airlines Center20,168
| 37–37
|- style="background:#fcc
| 75
| March 28
| @ New Orleans
| 
| Buddy Hield (27)
| Willie Cauley-Stein (12)
| De'Aaron Fox (12)
| Smoothie King Center13,976
| 37–38
|- style="background:#fcc
| 76
| March 30
| @ Houston
| 
| Bogdan Bogdanović (24)
| Marvin Bagley (12)
| De'Aaron Fox (10)
| Toyota Center18,055
| 37–39
|- style="background:#cfc
| 77
| March 31
| @ San Antonio
| 
| Buddy Hield (26)
| Kosta Koufos (11)
| Bogdanović, Fox (5)
| AT&T Center18,407
| 38–39

|- style="background:#fcc
| 78
| April 2
| Houston
| 
| Buddy Hield (20)
| Corey Brewer (10)
| Hield, Fox (5)
| Golden 1 Center17,583
| 38–40
|- style="background:#cfc
| 79
| April 4
| Cleveland
| 
| Buddy Hield (23)
| Willie Cauley-Stein (9)
| De'Aaron Fox (10)
| Golden 1 Center17,583
| 39–40
|- style="background:#fcc
| 80
| April 5
| @ Utah
| 
| Buddy Hield (17)
| Marvin Bagley (12)
| Yogi Ferrell (5)
| Vivint Smart Home Arena18,306
| 39–41
|- style="background:#fcc
| 81
| April 7
| New Orleans
| 
| Harrison Barnes (29)
| Marvin Bagley (14)
| De'Aaron Fox (11)
| Golden 1 Center17,583
| 39–42
|- style="background:#fcc
| 82  
| April 10
| @ Portland
| 
| Marvin Bagley (20)
| Marvin Bagley (9)
| De'Aaron Fox (9)
| Moda Center19,814
| 39–43

Player statistics

|-
| align="left"| || align="center"| PF
| 62 || 4 || 1,567 || 471 || 62 || 33 || style=";"|59 || 923
|-
| align="left"|≠ || align="center"| SF
| 28 || 28 || 949 || 154 || 53 || 17 || 2 || 399
|-
| align="left"| || align="center"| PF
| 77 || 70 || 1,788 || 444 || 147 || 54 || 56 || 741
|-
| align="left"| || align="center"| SG
| 70 || 17 || 1,947 || 243 || 267 || 72 || 15 || 990
|-
| align="left"|≠ || align="center"| SF
| 24 || 0 || 352 || 59 || 29 || 20 || 5 || 98
|-
| align="left"|≠ || align="center"| SG
| 13 || 0 || 127 || 22 || 10 || 8 || 1 || 22
|-
| align="left"| || align="center"| C
| 81 || 81 || 2,213 || style=";"|678 || 194 || 96 || 51 || 965
|-
| align="left"| || align="center"| PG
| 71 || 3 || 1,067 || 109 || 137 || 36 || 4 || 420
|-
| align="left"| || align="center"| PG
| 81 || 81 || 2,546 || 304 || style=";"|590 || style=";"|133 || 45 || 1,399
|-
| align="left"| || align="center"| PF
| 58 || 0 || 820 || 222 || 85 || 31 || 22 || 408
|-
| align="left"| || align="center"| SG
| style=";"|82 || style=";"|82 || style=";"|2,615 || 412 || 205 || 58 || 33 || style=";"|1,695
|-
| align="left"|† || align="center"| SF
| 52 || 3 || 1,083 || 146 || 68 || 23 || 13 || 346
|-
| align="left"|≠ || align="center"| SF
| 1 || 0 || 6 || 0 || 0 || 0 || 0 || 2
|-
| align="left"| || align="center"| C
| 42 || 1 || 502 || 177 || 36 || 15 || 18 || 156
|-
| align="left"|† || align="center"| PF
| 13 || 0 || 113 || 24 || 6 || 2 || 3 || 36
|-
| align="left"| || align="center"| PG
| 38 || 0 || 435 || 43 || 84 || 16 || 4 || 195
|-
| align="left"|‡ || align="center"| SG
| 19 || 0 || 158 || 17 || 4 || 6 || 3 || 75
|-
| align="left"|† || align="center"| SG
| 42 || 40 || 1,099 || 129 || 91 || 47 || 20 || 374
|-
| align="left"|≠ || align="center"| PF
| 3 || 0 || 33 || 12 || 4 || 2 || 1 || 8
|-
| align="left"| || align="center"| SF
| 21 || 0 || 312 || 59 || 11 || 10 || 8 || 111
|}
After all games.
‡Waived during the season
†Traded during the season
≠Acquired during the season

Transactions

Trades

Free agency

Additions

Subtractions

References

Sacramento Kings
Sacramento Kings
Sacramento Kings
Sacramento Kings seasons